Charles Crawford (30 August 1897 Nashville, Tennessee – 1 June 1958 Calhoun, Georgia) was an American racecar driver.

Indy 500 results

Source:

References

1897 births
1958 deaths
Indianapolis 500 drivers
Sportspeople from Nashville, Tennessee
Racing drivers from Nashville, Tennessee
Racing drivers from Tennessee